Xiu Zelan (15 August 1925 – 27 February 2016), also written as Hsiu Tse-Lan, was a Taiwanese architect. Xue was born in Yuanling, Hunan. During World War II she attended the Architecture Department of National Central University in Chongqing (Now Southeast University School of Architecture). In 1947 she entered the Taiwan Rail Bureau. She took charge of the Department of General Logistics and Engineering as an assistant engineer. Her modernist interpretations of traditional motifs gained the attention of Chiang Kai-shek, and in 1965 she took charge of Yangmingshan's Chung-Shan Building project. Designed to house state ceremonies, the Chung-Shan Building brought Xiu acclaim and the project was subsequently considered to be one of her crowning achievements and earned the popular title "Number 1 Female Architect of Taiwan". Subsequently, on April 30, 1967, Xiu was awarded the first Golden Tripod Award for Architecture (alongside fellow architects including Wang Da-hong, Chen Chi-Kwan, Chen Ren-he, Haigo T. H. Shen, and Yang Cho-cheng). In 2015, on the 50th anniversary of the Chung-Shan Building's completion, she was presented with a certificate of gratitude from the Taiwanese government.

Early years

Childhood 
Xiu Zelan was born on August 15, 1925, in Yuanling, Hunan.

Education and early work 
In 1937, Xiu enrolled in the Architecture Department of the National Central University in Chongqing (now Southeast University School of Architecture). The university was previously situated in Nanjing, but moved to Chongqing due to eruption of the Second World War. It is around this time Xiu first became acquainted with Chiang Kai-shek, who was serving as the principle of the university.

She began practicing as an architect upon graduation, entering her first job at the Ministry of Communications at Nanking (also written as Nanjing) in 1947. She was sent to Shanghai the following year, but design jobs were scarce due to “bad times”.

In 1949, as the Chinese Civil War escalated, Xiu accepted a job invitation at the Taiwan Railways Administration and started the new chapter of her career in Taiwan.

Career in Taiwan

Post at the Taiwan Railways Administration 
Xiu was assigned to the Department of General Logistics and Engineering as an assistant engineer / architect. Despite the department suffering from the lack of funds and resources, Xiu was soon involved in many major projects. One of the most notable examples was the Banqiao (also written as Panchiao) Train Station, now demolished.

Xiu met fellow engineer, C. K. Fu, when they were both working in the Department of General Logistics and Engineering in the TRA. They were later married in 1953, and had a son together.

In 1955, Xiu and her husband left their posts at the TRA, and established a private practice together in the following year.

Private practice and rising fame

Representative works 
Banqiao Station
Chung-Shan Building
Taipei Women's Teacher Junior College
Viator High School Church
Lanyang Girl's Middle School Auditorium
Banqiao Senior High School
Chung-Shan Girl's Middle School Auditorium
Taipei Jingmei Girls School Library and Admin Building
Chih Shan Junior High School
Wu Feng Elementary School
National Chia-Yi Girls' Senior High School
Hu-wei Senior High School
National Chung Hsing Senior High School
Hualien Normal University Library
Sun Moon Lake Teacher's Hall
Taichung Teacher's Hall
Yangming Senior High School
Taipei Mingde Junior High School

References

Yuanling County
Chinese architects
People from Huaihua
National Central University alumni
Southeast University alumni
Taiwanese architects
1925 births
2016 deaths
Artists from Hunan
Taiwanese women architects